Culladia evae is a moth in the family Crambidae. It was described by Stanisław Błeszyński in 1970. It is found in the Philippines, Java, New Guinea, China (Hainan) and Palau.

References

Crambini
Moths described in 1970
Moths of Asia